Cremnops is a genus of insects belonging to the family Braconidae.

The species of this genus are found in Europe and Japan.

Species:
 Cremnops desertor (Linnaeus, 1758)

References

Braconidae
Braconidae genera